Khurana may refer to:

 Khurana, a surname in India
Khurana river, one of the rivers of Sindh river system in Jammu and Kashmir, India
 Khurana, Punjab, a village in Punjab, India